Central Stadium was a multi-use stadium in Mangalia. It was the home ground of Callatis Mangalia. It had the capacity to hold 5,000 people.
It was demolished in 2021.

Football venues in Romania
Mangalia
Buildings and structures in Constanța County
Demolished buildings and structures in Romania
Sports venues demolished in 2021